The 2012 Fort Wayne Summer Cash was held from August 17 to 19 at the Lutheran Health Sportscenter in Fort Wayne, Indiana as part of the 2012–13 Ontario Curling Tour. The event was held in a round robin format, with the purse for the event being USD$7,500.

Teams

Round Robin Standings

Tiebreaker

Playoffs

External links
Event Host Site

Fort Wayne Summer Cash
Curling in Indiana